Western Carolina Regional Airport  is a county-owned public-use airport located  west of the central business district of Andrews, in Cherokee County, North Carolina, United States. It was formerly known as Andrews-Murphy Airport.

Although many U.S. airports use the same three-letter location identifier for the FAA and IATA, this facility is assigned RHP by the FAA and has no assignment from the IATA (which assigned RHP to Ramechhap, Nepal). The airport's ICAO identifier is KRHP.

Airport history 
The County Airport was built and open to the public after WWII in July 1947. At the time the airport name was the Wood Field Andrews-Murphy Regional Airport. Nowadays the airport terminal is named after legendary aviator Mr. Richard Parker (93).

Facilities and aircraft 
It has one runway designated 8/26 with an asphalt surface measuring 5,500 by 100 feet (1,676 x 30 m).

For the 12-month period ending September 8, 2008, the airport had 20,500 aircraft operations, an average of 56 per day: 93% general aviation, 5% air taxi, and 2% military. At that time there were 73 aircraft based at this airport: 64% single-engine, 27% multi-engine and 8% helicopter.

Airport services
The KRHP service features tie-down and hangar space as well as fuel and service: 100LL, JET-A, JET-A1+.

References

External links 
 Western Carolina Regional Airport at Cherokee County web site
  at North Carolina DOT airport guide
 

Airports in North Carolina
Transportation in Cherokee County, North Carolina
Buildings and structures in Cherokee County, North Carolina